Ahmed Marzouki (born 1947 in Bouajoul, Commune of Sidi Yahya Bni Zeroual, Taounate Province)  is a former military Moroccan officer who was forcibly disappeared after the failed coup attempt of 1971.

Marzouki was a prisoner in Tazmamart, a notorious former secret detention centre in Morocco during the reign of Hassan II. First arrested in 1973, he was finally released in 1991, but faced state harassment for years after. He is the author of a book about his experiences, Tazmamart Cellule 10 (Tazmamart Cell 10).

Works 

 Tazmamart cellule 10, Gallimard, 13 septembre 2001 
 La peine du vide, Éditions Tarik, 2012.
 Les bonnes nouvelles, Éditions Tarik, 2016.
Tazmamart cella 10, Csa Editrice, 2018.

See also 
 Ali Bourequat
 Years of lead
 Human rights in Morocco

Further reading 
 Tazmamart Cellule 10, Editions Paris Méditerranée; Casablanca: Tarik Editions

External links 
 International Human Rights Federation (FIDH) - Interview with Mr. Marzouki. 

1947 births
20th-century Moroccan people
21st-century Moroccan people
Living people
Politics of Morocco
Moroccan prisoners and detainees
Moroccan writers
Moroccan writers in French
Moroccan military personnel
People from Taounate
Moroccan escapees
Moroccan military officers
Moroccan mutineers
Moroccan torture victims